Thomas Holder Kutz (born ) is an American politician and attorney who currently represents the 87th District in the Pennsylvania House of Representatives as a Republican since 2023.

Early life and education
Kutz was born in Pennsylvania, and grew up in the Mechanicsburg area. He graduated from Cedar Cliff High School in 2013, and later graduated magna cum laude with a Bachelor of Arts degree in political science from Grove City College in 2016. Kutz earned his Juris doctor degree from Widener University Commonwealth Law School in 2022.

Political career
After graduating from college, Kutz worked as an aide for the U.S. House Ways and Means Committee. Following law school, he worked as a policy director for the Republican caucus in the Pennsylvania Senate.

In 2019, Kutz was elected to the Lower Allen Township Board of Commissioners. 

In March 2022, Kutz announced he would seek the Republican nomination to represent the 87th District in the Pennsylvania House of Representatives. The seat was open after incumbent Greg Rothman chose to seek election to the Pennsylvania Senate. Running on a platform of fiscal conservatism, Kutz won the Republican primary election against businessman Eric Clancy, and later defeated Democrat Kristal Markle in the general election.

Kutz currently sits on the State House's Appropriations Committee, Housing & Community Development Committee, and Insurance Committee.

Personal life
Kutz married his wife Allie on September 17, 2022. The couple currently live in Lower Allen Township in Cumberland County, Pennsylvania.

Electoral history

|-
! style="background-color: #800080; width: 8px;" |
| style="width: 130px" | Democratic/Republican
|               | Thomas Kutz
| align="right" | 2,992
| align="right" | 30.87
|-

|-
! style="background-color: #800080; width: 8px;" |
| style="width: 130px" | Democratic/Republican
|               | Carolyn Holtzman
| align="right" | 2,878
| align="right" | 29.70
|-

References

Living people
Republican Party members of the Pennsylvania House of Representatives
21st-century American politicians
People from Cumberland County, Pennsylvania